Dominik Beršnjak (born 15 July 1981) is a Slovenian football manager and former player who is the head coach of Bilje.

Club career

In June 2008, Beršnjak joined Politehnica Iaşi. After three years, he left the club after they were relegated.

In summer 2010, he signed for his former club Celje.

International career
Beršnjak played one game for the Slovenia national team in 2006.

Honours
Maribor
Slovenian Cup: 2003–04
Celje
Slovenian Cup: 2004–05

References

External links
 
 

1981 births
Living people
Footballers from Ljubljana
Slovenian footballers
Association football midfielders
Slovenian expatriate footballers
Slovenia youth international footballers
Slovenia under-21 international footballers
Slovenia international footballers
Slovenian PrvaLiga players
Liga I players
NK Celje players
K.R.C. Genk players
NK Maribor players
FC Politehnica Iași (1945) players
Soproni VSE players
Expatriate footballers in Belgium
Expatriate footballers in Romania
Expatriate footballers in Hungary
Expatriate footballers in Myanmar
Expatriate footballers in Austria
Slovenian expatriate sportspeople in Belgium
Slovenian expatriate sportspeople in Romania
Slovenian expatriate sportspeople in Hungary
Slovenian expatriate sportspeople in Austria
Slovenian football managers
NK Rudar Velenje managers